Palpopleura portia, the Portia Widow, is a species of dragonfly in the family Libellulidae. It is found in Angola, Botswana, Burkina Faso, Central African Republic, the Democratic Republic of the Congo, Ivory Coast, Equatorial Guinea, Ethiopia, Gambia, Kenya, Madagascar, Malawi, Mozambique, Namibia, Nigeria, Senegal, Somalia, South Africa, Sudan, Tanzania, Togo, Uganda, Zambia, Zimbabwe, and possibly Burundi. Its natural habitats are dry savanna, moist savanna, subtropical or tropical dry shrubland, subtropical or tropical moist shrubland, rivers, intermittent rivers, shrub-dominated wetlands, swamps, freshwater lakes, intermittent freshwater lakes, freshwater marshes, intermittent freshwater marshes, and freshwater springs.

References

Libellulidae
Taxonomy articles created by Polbot
Insects described in 1773
Taxa named by Dru Drury